Hansen Lake may refer to:

 Hansen Lake (Arkansas); see List of lakes in Saline County, Arkansas
 Hansen Lake (Kenora District), a lake in Kenora District, Ontario, Canada
 Hansen Lake (Nipissing District), a lake in Nipissing District, Ontario, Canada
 Hansen Lake (Sudbury District), a lake in Sudbury District, Ontario, Canada